Stevie Riga (born 15 September 1989) is a retired French professional footballer.

Club career

Riga made his professional debut for Angers SCO in Ligue 2 on 6 November 2009 in a game against SC Bastia.

External links
 
 

1989 births
Living people
People from Sucy-en-Brie
French footballers
Ligue 2 players
Angers SCO players
Association football defenders
Footballers from Val-de-Marne